Ezhumattoor Devi Temple is a temple located at Ezhumattoor. The primary deity of Ezhumattoor Devi Temple is Devi.

The temple is known as Sree Panamattathukavu Devi Temple and it annually celebrates the Vishu Padayani on the first day of the Malayalam month of Medam. The festival is celebrated for seven days and includes various rituals such as Chootu vaipu, Thappu, Kaimaini, Kolam's dance, Adavi, and Eda Padayani. The main event of the festival is Valiya Padayani, also known as Vishu Padayani, which is celebrated on the day of Vishu and is considered a big day for the goddess. The festival also includes a Vinodam called 'Thangalum Padayum', which is a comic interlude performed by individuals dressed as Muslim warriors, showcasing the communal harmony in the area.

References

Devi temples in Kerala
Hindu temples in Pathanamthitta district